Suigetsu may refer to:
Suigetsu Hozuki, a villain from the Naruto series
Suigetsu Mayoi Gokoro, a port of the video game by KID to the Dreamcast system, released on October 28, 2004.
 Suigetsu (Danzan-ryu Jujitsu Technique)
 Lake Suigetsu in Japan